Paranomus adiantifolius, the hairy-style sceptre, is a flower-bearing shrub that belongs to the genus Paranomus and forms part of the fynbos. The plant is native to the Western Cape, South Africa.

Description
Fire destroys the plant but the seeds survive. The plant is bisexual and pollinated by insects. The fruit ripens two months after flowering, and the seeds fall to the ground where they are spread by ants.

Distribution and habitat
The plant occurs at Wolfieskop in the Riviersonderend Mountains, Groenlandberg, and Houhoek.

References

External links

adiantifolius